Pungert may refer to several places in Slovenia: 

Pungert, Ivančna Gorica, a settlement in the Municipality of Ivančna Gorica
Pungert, Loški Potok, a settlement in the Municipality of Loški Potok
Pungert, Škofja Loka, a settlement in the Municipality of Škofja Loka
Pungrt, Gabrje pri Stični, a hamlet of Gabrje pri Stični, also known as Pungert